Shafiqul Islam may refer to:
 Shafiqul Islam (academic) (born 1960), Bangladeshi-American academic and author
 Shafiqul Islam (cricketer) (born 1997), Bangladeshi cricketer
 Shafiqul Islam (police officer), Bangladeshi police commissioner
 Shafiqul Islam (Kishoreganj politician), Kishoreganj District of Bangladesh
 Shafiqul Islam (Sirajganj politician), Bangladesh